Mansurabad (also Romanized as Manşūrābād) is a village in Gowhar Kuh Rural District, Nukabad District, Khash County, Sistan and Baluchestan Province, Iran. At the 2006 census, its population was 143, in 31 families.

References 

Populated places in Khash County